Ronald P. "Ron" Von der Porten (born 1936) is an American bridge player from Orinda, California.

Books 

 Introduction to Defensive Bidding (Prentice-Hall, 1967), 151 pp.
 Introduction to Competitive Bidding, Charles Goren and Von der Porten (Doubleday, 1984), 179 pp.

Bridge accomplishments

Wins

 North American Bridge Championships (6)
 Blue Ribbon Pairs (1) 1986 
 Grand National Teams (1) 1982 
 Vanderbilt (1) 1967 
 Reisinger (1) 1962 
 Spingold (2) 1975, 1980

Runners-up

 Bermuda Bowl (2) 1962, 1977
 North American Bridge Championships
 Rockwell Mixed Pairs (1) 1984 
 Blue Ribbon Pairs (1) 1965 
 Vanderbilt (3) 1961, 1963, 1971 
 Mitchell Board-a-Match Teams (1) 1970

References

External links
 
 

1936 births
American contract bridge players
Bermuda Bowl players
Contract bridge writers
People from Orinda, California
Living people
Place of birth missing (living people)
Date of birth missing (living people)